Gaveh may refer to:
 Gaveh-ye Kalateh, Razavi Khorasan Province
 Gaveh-ye Khalseh, Razavi Khorasan Province
 Gaveh, Khusf, South Khorasan Province
 Gaveh, Nehbandan, South Khorasan Province
 Gaveh, Sistan and Baluchestan